Totti Truman Taylor, born Dorothy Leah Truman (7 September 1915 – 5 March 1981), was a British actress. Her mother’s 2nd husband’s surname was Taylor, and this is where her stage name came from. In 1953, she played Aunt Sally in the BBC television series Worzel Gummidge Turns Detective. She was born in the Mapperley Park area of Nottingham and died at Denville Hall, Northwood, in Middlesex. She also played various roles in Hancock's Half Hour.

Selected filmography
Passenger to Tokyo, Scotland Yard series (1954) Series 1 Ep 10 ...Headmistress
 Eight O'Clock Walk (1954) ..... Miss Ribden-White
 The Crowded Day (1954) ..... Ernest's Wife
 The French, They Are a Funny Race (1955) ..... Miss Fyfyth, the nurse
 Not So Dusty (1956) ..... Charlotte Duncan 
 Town on Trial (1957)
 Rx Murder (1958)
 Undercover Girl (1958)
 Moment of Indiscretion (1958)
 There Was a Crooked Man (1960) ..... Woman in a taxi
 Compelled (1960) ..... Lady 
 The Gentle Terror (1961) ..... Mrs. Connor
 Crooks Anonymous (1962)
 Band of Thieves (1962)
 A Stitch in Time (1963) ..... Rich woman throwing a bracelet
 The Wrong Box (1966) ..... Lady at Launching
 Press for Time (1966) ..... Mrs. Doe Connor
 Chitty Chitty Bang Bang (1968) ..... Duchess
 A Nice Girl Like Me (1969) ..... Miss Charter
 Confessions of a Window Cleaner (1974) ..... Elderly Lady

References

Death information (You have to download the PDF-file to access the information, Truman-Taylor is fourth from the top on the list.

External links
 

1915 births
1981 deaths
20th-century English actresses
English film actresses
English television actresses